Kalegah or Kalegeh may refer to:
 Kalegah, Ilam
 Kalegah, Kermanshah
 Kalegah-e Zaman, Kermanshah Province

See also
 Kalgah (disambiguation)
 Kalgeh